, born on June 19, 1969, in Yanagawa, Fukuoka, is a transgender woman who is a Japanese tarento and choreographer. After studying dance in New York City, she returned to Japan and was a member of the musical group Dos with Taeco Nishikawa and Asami Yoshino.

Life and career
As a celebrity, Kaba-chan was open with her sexuality. While she was already known for her flamboyant character in Dos, she came out as a gay man publicly on television on a 2002 episode of the Japanese variety show Dancing Sanma Palace. In October 2014, when appearing on the talk show Uchi Kuru!? with drag queen Mitz Mangrove and transvestite LGBT activist Matsuko Deluxe, Kaba-chan revealed that she had undergone orchiectomy that past June, in addition to having had plastic surgery and begun hormone therapy, and intended to have her gender officially changed in the koseki. In July 2015, she revealed while on the television show Non-Stop! that she was preparing to travel abroad to undergo counseling in preparation for sex reassignment surgery, as the Japanese law requires she medically transition before being allowed to have her gender legally changed, saying she may have been born a man but would like to die as a woman. In August, she appeared on a special women's only talk show promoting the release of the film Piece of Cake and announced that she would be going out of Japan to wait for her surgery. She expressed a desire to have her gender change officially recognized in front of a crowd at the National Olympic Stadium and that fellow LGBT celebrities Mitz Mangrove, Matsuko Deluxe, and Ikko were all supportive of her decision and wished her good health.

Kaba-chan was also a (male performing) contestant on two editions of Japan's Dancing with the Stars entitled , winning its "1 day special" episode with dancing partner Hidemi Yamamoto performing a pasodoble and also winning its second "1 day special" with partner RYOKO performing a salsa.

Choreography
SMAP
SMAP×SMAP
"Sekai ni Hitotsu Dake no Hana"
SMAP concerts
Namie Amuro
"Body Feels Exit"
"Chase the Chance"
"Don't Wanna Cry"
"You're My Sunshine"
"Sweet 19 Blues"
"A Walk in the Park"
"How to Be a Girl"
"Toi et Moi"
Play
Namie Amuro "Play" Tour 2007–2008
Tomomi Kahara
"keep yourself alive"
"I Believe"
"Arigato ne!"
dos
"Baby baby baby"
"More Kiss"
"Close Your Eyes"
Toshinori Yonekura
Tanpopo
"Last Kiss"
MAX
"Love impact"
"Ginga no Chikai"
Arisa Mizuki
Sanpei
"Sanpei Days"
"Sanpei no 39 Days"
"Sanpei no Everyday"
Rag Fair
"Rabu Rabu na Couple, Furi Furi de Chū"
Chiaki with Kaba-chan
"Tsuraine Akachan!"
Keiko Matsuzaka
Pink Lady
Memorial concert
Peter
Pabo
"Koi no Hexagon"
Yazima Beauty Salon
"Hamaguri Bomber"

Discography
 performed by Rica Matsumoto/Toshiko Ezaki
Track 3:  performed by 
 performed by Chiaki with Kaba-chan
 performed by C.K.M. (Chiaki, Kaba-chan, & Monroe)

Filmography

Film
Arashi no Yoru Ni - Grandmother goat
Pokémon: Destiny Deoxys - Voice cameo
Yazima Beauty Salon The Movie: Reaching a Nevada Dream - Mysterious cleaning lady
Kamen Rider × Kamen Rider Wizard & Fourze: Movie War Ultimatum - Yu Kamimura
Kamen Rider Wizard in Magic Land - Yu Kamimura
Kamen Rider × Kamen Rider Gaim & Wizard: The Fateful Sengoku Movie Battle - Yu Kamimura

Television
Waratte Iitomo! (regular from October 2002 to March 2005)
Pokémon Chronicles
Super Morning commentator
Jungle Tantei (2009) - Hippo (Voice)
Kamen Rider Wizard (2012) - Yu Kamimura

References

External links
 Official blog 

1969 births
Japanese choreographers
Living people
Japanese LGBT musicians
Japanese transgender people
People from Yanagawa, Fukuoka
Actors from Fukuoka Prefecture
Transgender women
21st-century Japanese actresses